Audison is one of the brands of  the Italian company Elettromedia s.r.l., a manufacturer of car audio products. The company was founded in 1979, but Audison name (born from Latin words Audio and Sonus) was registered in 1984. Currently Audison has different kinds of mobile audio products: amplifiers, audio processors, speakers and subwoofers.

Audison has won numerous awards for sound quality as well as “amplifier” of the year awards (EISA and CES awards). The brand also counts many "Firsts" in its history: first amplifier with adjustable gain controls, first to build a dedicated mono block bass amplifier, first 5 channel amplifier.

See also

 List of Italian Companies

External links
 Official Audison website
 Official Elettromedia website
 Official CES website
 Official EISA website

Audio equipment manufacturers of Italy
Electronics companies established in 1979
Italian companies established in 1979
Italian brands